Korea Development Bank (KDB Bank, SWIFT: KODBKRSE) is a wholly state-owned policy development bank in South Korea. It was founded in 1954 in accordance with The Korea Development Bank Act to finance and manage major industrial projects to expedite industrial development of Korea. As a 61st biggest global bank (The Banker Top 1000 World Bank List in 2018), KDB Bank has not only fostered the growth of strategic industries but also facilitates the turnaround of troubled companies through restructuring and provides capital for strategic development projects. Since 2000, it has diversified into investment banking services and operates as a CIB (Commercial and Investment Bank). Nevertheless, it is a major restructuring player and has saved a lot of big companies during major financial crisis, especially in 1997 Asian financial crisis and Financial crisis of 2007–2008.

Offices (as of December 2018)
Domestic Branch : 69 locations in South Korea

International Subsidiary (5) : China (Hong Kong), Hungary (Budapest), Uzbekistan (Tashkent), Brazil (São Paulo), Ireland (Dublin)

International Branch (9) : USA (New York), U.K. (London), Singapore (Singapore), Japan (Tokyo), China (Beijing, Shanghai, Guangzhou, Shenyang, Qingdao)

Representative Office (8) : Philippines (Manila), Vietnam (Ho Chi Minh City), Thailand (Bangkok), Australia (Sydney), Germany (Frankfurt), U.A.E. (Abu Dhabi), Russia (Moscow), China (Yangon)

Credit rating (as of December 2018)
The bank is fully owned by the Republic of Korea government and it shares the same credit rating.

Moody's : Aa2

S&P : AA

Fitch : AA-

History
KDB Bank was founded in 1954 to supply and manage major industrial capital to help develop Korean industries and the national economy. For the half century since then, KDB Bank has faithfully fulfilled its role as a government-run bank, anticipating and coping with changes in the economic and financial environment.

2010's: Development banking for the new normal
Shifting focus of support from major conglomerates to medium-sized enterprises
Assist development under Fourth Industrial Revolution by widening investment fund
Proactive corporate restructuring of large corporations to avoid major financial distress

2000's: New financial policy amid market-oriented economic paradigm
Completion of Universal Banking Services with the four core businesses: Corporate Banking, Investment Banking, International Banking, and Corporate Restructuring/Consulting
Support for nation-wide infrastructure projects
Resolution of financial distress by taking leadership in corporate restructuring

1990's: Providing comprehensive corporate banking services
Support for technology-intensive industries including semiconductors
Reinforcement of comprehensive corporate banking services to help global expansion of corporate clients

1980's: Sustaining long-term industrial financing
Intensive support for automobile and electronic industries by providing long-term facility financing in order to construct a stable growth base of the national economy
Independent fund raise by issuing Industrial Finance Bonds (IFBs) overseas, carrying out the role of the primary long-term facility financial institution

1970's: Solidifying the development of Korea
Providing funding to heavy-industry from energy to chemical and export-oriented industries, meeting the government's 5-year economic development plan
Initiation of new financial businesses such as security underwriting and corporate bond guarantee

1950's: Supporting the nation's economic rehabilitation
Restoration of industrial facilities destroyed during the Korean War including basic industries such as electricity, coal, and cement

Operations and services
Corporate Banking
Corporate Banking
Corporate Restructuring
Investment Banking
M&A
Venture Capital  
Project Finance  
Private Equity
International Banking
Syndication
Structured Finance
F/X Trading
Trade Finance
Indirect Financing
On-lending
SME Venture Capital Fund

Consulting

Consumer Banking

Trust & Pension

Key financial data

Subsidiary
KDB Capital
 Founded as a leasing company and diversified into corporate banking and VC/PE investment
KDB Infra (KDB Infrastructure Investments Asset Management)
 Major infrastructure project investor in Korea
KDB Investment
 Corporate restructuring PEF for assets under KDB Bank

References 

Banks of South Korea
Government-owned companies of South Korea
Financial services companies of South Korea
Banks established in 1954
National development banks